This is a list of princesses of Montenegro, including those who continued to use the title after Montenegro, Serbia and the Kingdom of Serbs, Croats and Slovenes (later Yugoslavia) ceased to be monarchies.

Princesses by blood

Princesses by marriage 
For a list of Princesses and Queens Consort, see List of Montenegrin royal consorts.

References 

Montenegro
 
Montenegro-related lists